This is the discography of The Coral, an English indie rock, psychedelic folk and indie pop band. The Coral has released eight studio albums, one compilation album, eighteen singles and four extended plays.

Albums

Studio albums

Compilation albums

EPs
 The Oldest Path EP (2001)
 Skeleton Key EP (2002)
 Calendars & Clocks EP (2004)
 iTunes Festival: London (2007)
 Holy Mountain Picnic Massacre Blues (2016)

Singles

Notes

Music videos

Other appearances

Guest appearances
 Ian Broudie – Tales Told (2004)
 The Lightning Seeds  – Four Winds (2009)
 Ian Skelly – Cut from a Star (2012)
 James Skelly & the Intenders – Love Undercover (2013)
 Sundowners – Sundowners (2015)
 The Serpent Power – The Serpent Power (2015)

Compilation appearances
  Help!: A Day in the Life (2005) – "It Was Nothing"
  Sound '07 (2007) – "Come Go With Me"

See also
 List of songs recorded by The Coral

References

External links
 
 
 
 

Discographies of British artists
Rock music group discographies